Henry Frederick "Harry" Boyle (10 December 1847 – 21 November 1907) was a leading Australian cricketer of the 1870s and 1880s.

Boyle played for Victoria and had the distinction of visiting England with the Australian representative touring teams, of 1878, 1880, 1882, 1884, 1888 and in 1890 as manager.

The slightly reticent Boyle was chosen as captain for the 1880 tour but a shipboard team meeting voted to replace him with the more outgoing Billy Murdoch before their arrival.  

An outstanding medium-pacer, Boyle's greatest strengths were said to be the accuracy of his deliveries and his ability to probe a batsman's weaknesses. W G Grace wrote of Boyle in his 1899 Cricketing Reminiscences, 'Boyle had a rare head on his shoulders, but was often successful in getting batsmen out when other bowlers as good had tried and completely failed.' 

His bowling was considered to be particularly effective under English conditions. His achievements with the ball were often overshadowed by the exploits of his team mate, "The Demon Bowler", Fred Spofforth. While this was the case, the Sydney newspaper the Referee noted, '. . . Boyle bowled more with his head than Spoff did. And it was a deal better head too.'

He was an exceptionally good close-in fielder, too, and a brave if limited batsman. In all, he played 12 Tests, taking 32 wickets at an average 20.03.

Boyle played Australian rules football for Sandhurst Football Club in 1872 and 1873 and the Carlton Football Club in 1874.

References

External links

1847 births
1907 deaths
Australia Test cricketers
Australian cricketers
Carlton Football Club
Cricketers from Sydney
Victoria cricketers